Pardosa proxima is a wolf spider species with a distribution of "Macaronesia, Europe, Russia, China".

See also 
 List of Lycosidae species

References 

proxima
Spiders of Europe
Spiders of Macaronesia
Spiders of Asia
Spiders described in 1847